Gennady Nikitich Olonkin (1898-September 1960) was a Russian-Norwegian polar explorer, telegraphist and radio operator.

Biography
Gennady Nikitich Olonkin was born in the Arkhangelsk Governorate of the Russian Empire. Olonkin was the only son among twelve children of a Norwegian mother and a Russian father.

From 1918 to 1925, he was a  telegraph and radio operator as well as mechanic on the polar ship Maud, led by Roald Amundsen. In 1926, Olonkin took part in the first part of the Amundsen-Ellsworth 1926 Transpolar Flight with the airship Norge  from Rome to Svalbard providing radio contact with the different ground control stations.

In 1926 he was honored as a Knight of the Order of St. Olav. Olonkin acquired Norwegian citizenship and worked at the Norwegian Meteorological Institute. He served on Jan Mayen in the years 1928–1929, 1930–1931, 1933–1934, and 1935–1936. From 1958 he worked in conjunction with an expansion of a LORAN station (NATO) on Jan Mayen.
 
Gennadij Olonkin was married and had one son and two daughters. He died during 1960 in Tromsø, Norway. Both Cape Olonkin and Olonkinbyen on the island of Jan Mayen have been named in his honor.

References

External links 
 Gendij Olonkin at Norsk Polarhistorie Norwegian Polar Institute (in Norwegian)
 Place names at Svalbard and Jan Mayen  (Norwegian Polar Institute)

1898 births
1960 deaths
People from Arkhangelsky Uyezd
Norwegian polar explorers
Russian explorers
Russian people of Norwegian descent
Emigrants from the Russian Empire to Norway
Naturalised citizens of Norway
Jan Mayen